Canicross is the sport of cross country running with dogs. Originating in Europe as off-season training for the mushing (sledding) community, it has become popular as a stand-alone sport all over Europe, especially in the UK. Canicross is closely related to bikejoring, where participants cycle with their dog and skijoring, where participants ski rather than run.

Canicross can be run with one or two dogs, always attached to the runner. The runner wears a waist belt, the dog a specifically designed harness, and the two are joined by a bungee cord or elastic line that reduces shock to both human and dog when the dog pulls.

Originally canicross dogs were of sledding or spitz types such as the husky or malamute but now all breeds have begun taking part including cross breeds, small terrier breeds to large breeds such as rottweilers and standard poodles. Not only can all breeds run but people of all ages and abilities can take part, including children and the disabled such as the visually impaired. Some breeds are very well suited to not only running and pulling but running at steady pace over a long distance. It encourages people and their dogs to take part in outdoor activities and meet other like minded individuals.

Canicross events

The first canicross event staged in the UK took place in 2000. In 2006/07 CaniX UK ran the first UK National Championship, the 2015/16 season will be the 10th UK National Championship. During this period over 2,500 UK dogs/competitors have taken part in 250 CaniX events. In March 2008 CaniX UK ran the first ever cani-cross event at Crufts, the largest dog show held in the world. Over 100 runners and their dogs took part in the event. In October 2012 CaniX UK hosted the first ECF European Canicross Championships in the UK in Cirencester, Gloucestershire. Representation in the UK to the International Canicross Federation is through the British Sleddog Sports Federation (BSSF)

Canicross events are held all over the UK and Europe by sleddog organisations, by canicross clubs and also many running events will allow runners to participate with their dogs. Distances vary, with events held to cover distances from a mile up to 28 miles or more.

International championships 
The 21st instance of the ICF International Canicross Federation Championships will take place in Bierawa, Poland on the 6 and 7th of October 2018.

Canicross in Italy 
In Italy canicross is sanctioned by the CSEN (sports promotion organisation officially recognised by the Italian National Olympic Committee), and also by privately held circuit FISC.

References
Citations

Bibliography

External links
 http://www.cani-fit.com
 
 British Sleddog Sports Federation
 Canicross Limburg-Zuid
 Canicross Trailrunners
 International Canicross Federation
 Canicross map
 
 
 
Running by type
Dog sports